Tanner Jeremie McKee (born April 27, 2000) is an American football quarterback for the Stanford Cardinal.

High school career
McKee attended Centennial High School in Corona, California. He played in the 2018 U.S. Army All-American Bowl and 2018 Polynesian Bowl, where he was named MVP. McKee committed to Stanford University to play college football.

College career
McKee spent two years on a mission for the Church of Jesus Christ of Latter-day Saints before playing at Stanford. His first season with the team was 2020, in which he played in one game, completing three passes for 62 yards against then 12th-ranked Oregon. McKee competed with Jack West for the starting job in 2021. Although West started during the season opener against Kansas State, McKee still attempted 18 passes, completing 15 of them for 118 yards and a touchdown. He was named the starter for the following week's game against Southern California (USC). In just his 4th collegiate start, McKee led the unranked Cardinal to a miraculous upset victory against the #3 ranked Oregon Ducks, throwing 3 touchdowns and spearheading an 87-yard game-tying drive at the end of the 4th quarter.

Statistics

References

External links
Stanford Cardinal bio

Living people
Sportspeople from Corona, California
Players of American football from California
American football quarterbacks
Stanford Cardinal football players
2000 births